George Reddy is a 2019 Telugu-language biographical film directed by B. Jeevan Reddy and starring Sandeep Madhav, debutante Muskaan Khubchandani. It is based on the life of the student leader of the same name.

Cast 

Sandeep Madhav as George Reddy
Srinivas Pokkale as young George
Muskaan Khubchandani as Maya / Muskaan (Dual role)
Abhay Bethiganti as Rajanna
Satya Dev as Satya
Shatru as Kishan Singh
Thiruveer as Lallan Singh
Manoj Nandam as Arjun
Chaitanya Krishna as Kaushik
Devika Daftardar as Leela Varghesin, Reddy's mother
Yadhamma Raju as Ram Nayak
Jagan Yogiraj as Jagan
Bunny Abiran as Manipal Reddy
Pawon Ramesh as Dastagiri
Vinay Varma as Minister Ramayya
Laxman Meesala as Laxman
Sanjay Reddy as Shankar
 Kautilya as Police Officer
Jagadeesh Prathap Bandhari as Bheem Naik
Sonia Akula as George Reddy's Sister

Production 
To prepare for the film, director Jeevan Reddy read the biopic of George Reddy. Sandeep Madhav was signed to enact the lead role after the director noticed that Madhav resembled George Reddy. Madhav lost weight to play George Reddy in his early twenties and worked out since George Reddy was also a boxer. A set was erected near by art director Gandhi Nadikudikar near Gachibowli that resembled Osmania University. Five-hundred to seven-hundred junior artists portrayed the roles of students in the film.

Soundtrack 
The songs and background score were composed by Suresh Bobbili and Harshavardhan Rameshwar, respectively. The song "Adugadugu Maa Prathi Adugu" was launched by Chiranjeevi.

Release 
The Hindu wrote that "It [the film] had the scope to be powerful and spark conversations about the history of student leaders and their ideologies, among a newer audience. This film doesn’t rise up to that potential". On the contrary, The Times of India gave the film a rating of three-and-a-half out of five stars and wrote that "The film will keep you gripped, move you with its dialogues and leave an emotional, powerful impact". Telangana Today wrote that "His [Madhav's] top-notch acting and the razor-blade fight sequences will remain the highlights of the film". The Deccan Chronicle wrote that "While interesting in parts, as a whole, the makers rely more on the name of the slain student leader rather than the content of his life". The Indian Express gave the film a rating of three out of five stars and wrote that ". Director B Jeevan Reddy’s film, which is set nearly 50 years ago, feels just as relevant today".

Awards and nominations

References

External links 

2010s biographical films
2010s political thriller films
2010s Telugu-language films
Biographical action films
Films set in Andhra Pradesh
Films set in the 1960s
Films shot in Andhra Pradesh
Indian biographical films
Indian political thriller films
Journalism adapted into films